Malassezia (formerly known as Pityrosporum) is a genus of fungi. It is the sole genus in family Malasseziaceae, which is the only family in order Malasseziales, itself the single member of class Malasseziomycetes. Malassezia species are naturally found on the skin surfaces of many animals, including humans. In occasional opportunistic infections, some species can cause hypopigmentation or hyperpigmentation on the trunk and other locations in humans. Allergy tests for these fungi are available.

Systematics

Due to progressive changes in their nomenclature, some confusion exists about the naming and classification of Malassezia yeast species. Work on these yeasts has been complicated because they require specific growth media and grow very slowly in laboratory culture.

Malassezia were originally identified by the French scientist Louis-Charles Malassez in the late nineteenth century. Raymond Sabouraud identified a dandruff-causing organism in 1904 and called it Pityrosporum malassez, honoring Malassez, but at the species level as opposed to the genus level. When it was determined that the organisms were the same, the term "Malassezia" was judged to possess priority.

In the mid-twentieth century, it was reclassified into two species:
 Pityrosporum (Malassezia) ovale, which is lipid-dependent and found only on humans. P. ovale was later divided into two species, P. ovale and P. orbiculare, but current sources consider these terms to refer to a single species of fungus, with M. furfur the preferred name.
 Pityrosporum (Malassezia) pachydermatis, which is lipophilic but not lipid-dependent. It is found on the skin of most animals.
In the mid-1990s, scientists at the Pasteur Institute in Paris, France, discovered additional species.

Malassezia is the sole genus in the family Malasseziaceae, which was validated by Cvetomir Denchev and Royall T. Moore in 2009. The order Malasseziales had been previously proposed by Moore in 1980, and later emended by Begerow and colleagues in 2000. At this time the order was classified as a member of unknown class placement in the subdivision Ustilaginomycotina. In 2014, Cvetomir and Teodor Denchev circumscribed the class Malasseziomycetes to contain the group.

Species
Species Fungorum accepts 22 species of Malassezia. The following list gives the name of the fungus, the taxonomic authority (those who first described the fungus, or who transferred it into Malassezia from another genus; standardized author abbreviations are used), and the name of the organism from which the fungus was isolated, if not human.

Malassezia arunalokei 
Malassezia brasiliensis  – from lesions on the beak of turquoise-fronted amazon parrot
Malassezia caprae  – from skin of goat
Malassezia cuniculi  – from healthy skin of external ear canal of rabbit
Malassezia dermatis 
Malassezia equi  – from skin of horse
Malassezia equina  – from skin of horse
Malassezia furfur 
Malassezia globosa 
Malassezia japonica 
Malassezia muris  – skin of mouse
Malassezia nana  – from discharge from ear of cat
Malassezia obtusa 
Malassezia ochoterenai 
Malassezia pachydermatis  – from skin of Indian rhinoceros
Malassezia psittaci  – from lesions on the beak of blue-headed parrot
Malassezia restricta 
Malassezia slooffiae  – from skin of pig
Malassezia sympodialis 
Malassezia tropica 
Malassezia vespertilionis  – from vesper bats in subfamily Myotinae
Malassezia yamatoensis

Role in human diseases

Dermatitis and dandruff 
Identification of Malassezia on skin has been aided by the application of molecular or DNA-based techniques. These investigations show that the Malassezia species causing most skin disease in humans, including the most common cause of dandruff and seborrhoeic dermatitis, is M. globosa (though M. restricta is also involved).  The skin rash of tinea versicolor (pityriasis versicolor) is also due to infection by this fungus.

As the fungus requires fat to grow, it is most common in areas with many sebaceous glands: on the scalp, face, and upper part of the body. When the fungus grows too rapidly, the natural renewal of cells is disturbed, and dandruff appears with itching (a similar process may also occur with other fungi or bacteria).

A project in 2007 has sequenced the genome of dandruff-causing Malassezia globosa and found it to have 4,285 genes. M. globosa uses eight different types of lipase, along with three phospholipases, to break down the oils on the scalp. Any of these 11 proteins would be a suitable target for dandruff medications.

The number of specimens of M. globosa on a human head can be up to ten million.

M. globosa has been predicted to have the ability to reproduce sexually, but this has not been observed.

Research 
Malassezia is among the many mycobiota undergoing laboratory research to investigate whether it is associated with types of disease.  Translocation of Malassezia spp. from the intestines into pancreatic neoplasms has been associated with pancreatic ductal adenocarcinoma, and the fungi may promote tumor progression through activation of host complement.

References

Further reading
 

Basidiomycota
Parasitic fungi
Yeasts
Taxa described in 1889
Taxa named by Henri Ernest Baillon